Abrus kaokoensis is a plant in the legume family Fabaceae, native to Namibia. The species is named for the country's Kaokoveld Desert.

Description
The leaves consist of four to eight pairs of leaflets, of oblong to obovate shape. The flowers are clustered, with a corolla of blue to purple petals. The species is considered most similar to Abrus schimperi.

Distribution and habitat
Abrus kaokoensis is only known from three locations in Namibia, all in Epupa Constituency near the Angola border. Therefore, the species may also occur in Angola, but areas neighbouring the Namibia border are little documented botanically. The type specimen was from the Kunene River valley.

Conservation
Despite its presence in a limited number of locations, Abrus kaokoensis is not considered threatened. Two of the species' populations coincide with livestock farming, but those populations appear healthy. The other population, in the Baynes Mountains, is in an unpopulated area.

A natural threat to Abrus kaokoensis comes from blister beetles, who consume the plant's flowers. As a result, few flowers in the studied area went on to produce pods and seeds.

References

Faboideae
Flora of Namibia
Plants described in 2011